The Shakespeare Yearbook is an annual academic journal specializing in Shakespearean and early modern topics. It was founded by Texas A&M Professor of English Douglas A. Brooks and edited by him until his death in 2009. The yearbook has been published by Texas A&M University since 2003.

The yearbook publishes thematically organized volumes: For example, "Shakespeare and Spain" (2002), "Shakespeare and the Low Countries" (2004), and "The Shakespeare Apocrypha" (2005).

References

Shakespearean scholarship
Periodicals about writers
Literary magazines published in the United States
Annual journals
English-language journals
Publications established in 1990
Texas A&M University